The Seal of the President of the Federal Republic of Nigeria is the official symbol of the Nigerian President. It was first used in 1979 by President Shehu Shagari in the ill-fated second republic, and jettisoned by the successive military regimes from 1983 to 1999. The presidential seal returned to usage in the wake of the fourth republic in 1999, and it has remained in use since.

See also
Coat of Arms of Nigeria
Nigerian heraldry
Seal of the Vice-President of Nigeria

References
 National Symbols of Nigeria
 Nigeria: President's New Helicopter May Be Rekitted

Nigeria
President of Nigeria, Seal of the
Government of Nigeria
Birds in art
Horses in art